The 2016–17 Longwood Lancers men's basketball team represented Longwood University during the 2016–17 NCAA Division I men's basketball season. They were led by head coach Jayson Gee, in his fourth season, and played their home games at Willett Hall in Farmville, Virginia as members of the Big South Conference. They finished the season 6–24, 3–15 in Big South play to finish in ninth place. They lost in the first round of the Big South tournament to Charleston Southern.

Previous season
The 2015–16 Lancers finished the 2015–16 season 10–23, 5–13 in Big South play to finish in a four-way tie for eighth place. They defeated Radford in the first round of the Big South tournament to advance to the quarterfinals where they lost to High Point.

Departures

Coaching changes
On June 4, 2016, assistant coach Adam Williams left to become the head coach at Division II Salem International University. On July 7, Gee announce that former Radford head coach Ron Bradley would be named as an assistant. On September 1, Anderson was promoted from director of basketball operations, replacing Samba Johnson.

Class of 2016 signees

Incoming transfers

Roster

Schedule and results

|-
!colspan=12 style=| Exhibition game

|-
!colspan=12 style=| Non-conference regular season

|-
!colspan=12 style=| Big South regular season

|-
!colspan=12 style=| Big South Conference tournament

References

Longwood Lancers men's basketball seasons
Longwood
Long
Long